Minna Palmroth is a professor in computational space physics at the University of Helsinki; her particular area of interest is magnetospheric physics and solar wind - magnetosphere interactions.

Life 
Palmroth is from Sahalahti, a small village in the former municipality by the same name near the city of Tampere, Finland. She studied physics at the University of Helsinki, graduating in 1999 with her first degree and in 2003 with a post-graduate degree. From 2013 to 2016 she was a researcher at the Earth Observation Programme of the Finnish Meteorological Institute. In January 2018 she was appointed director of the Finnish Centre of Excellence in Research of Sustainable Space.

References

Living people
Academic staff of the University of Helsinki
University of Helsinki alumni
Year of birth missing (living people)
Computational physicists